Laurent Bonnefoy is a CNRS researcher and author at CERI Sciences Po, Paris. He is a specialist in the politics of the Arabian peninsula. His book, Yemen and the World: Beyond Insecurity, won the Académie Française’s Prix Eugène Colas.

Selected publications
 Salafism in Yemen: Transnationalism and Religious Identity. Hurst & Co., London, 2011.
 Yemen and the World: Beyond Insecurity. Hurst & Co., London, 2018.

References

External links
 https://orientxxi.info/auteur/laurent-bonnefoy

Living people
Year of birth missing (living people)
Academic staff of Sciences Po
French non-fiction writers